Gould Lake may refer to:

Canada
 Gould Lake, Bruce County, Ontario
 Gould Lake (Frontenac County), Ontario
 Gould Lake Conservation Area, encompassing much of the lake
 Gould Lake (Lee Township, Ontario), in Timiskaming District, Ontario
 Gould Lake (Van Hise Township), in Timiskaming District, Ontario

United States
 Gould Lake, a waypoint on the River to River Trail in Illinois
 Gould Lake, mostly in Shingobee Township, Cass County, Minnesota
 Jay Gould Lake, a reservoir behind Pokegama Dam, Cohasset, Itasca County, Minnesota